Fritz Rammelmayr (born July 27, 1893) is a former German ice hockey player. Rammelmayr played on the Germany men's national ice hockey team at the 1928 Winter Olympics.

References

External links

Olympic profile

1893 births
Year of death missing
Ice hockey players at the 1928 Winter Olympics
Olympic ice hockey players of Germany
SC Riessersee players